Andreas Lønmo Knudsrød (born 1 January 1982 in Revetal, Norway) is a Norwegian drummer living in Oslo.

Biography 
Knudsrød is University Lecturer at the Norwegian Academy of Music in Oslo, department of Music Education and Music Therapy and playing with Blokk 5, Philco Fiction, Sacred Harp and Lama.

Discography 

With Splashgirl
2007: Doors. Keys. (AIM Records)
2009: Arbor (Hubro Music)
2011: Splashgirl / Huntsville (Hubro Music)
2011: Pressure (Hubro Music)
2013: Field Day Rituals (Hubro Music)

With Jæ
2010: Balls And Kittens, Draught And Strangling Rain'' (Hubro Music)

References

External links 

20th-century Norwegian drummers
21st-century Norwegian drummers
Norwegian jazz drummers
Male drummers
Norwegian percussionists
Norwegian jazz composers
Male jazz composers
Hubro Music artists
Academic staff of the Norwegian Academy of Music
1982 births
Living people
Musicians from Vestfold
20th-century drummers
20th-century Norwegian male musicians
21st-century Norwegian male musicians
Splashgirl members